The Bavarian Maximilian Order for Science and Art was first established on 28 November 1853 by King Maximilian II von Bayern. It is awarded to acknowledge and reward excellent and outstanding achievements in the field of science and art. From 1933 onwards (with the beginning of the Nazi regime) the order was no longer awarded, until 1980 when it was reinstated by the then Minister-President of the Free State of Bavaria Franz Josef Strauß. Munich jewellers Hemmerle have been responsible for making the medal since 1905.

Preamble 
In continuation of a Bavarian tradition, the Bavarian Maximilian Order for Science and Art was created. It is awarded to reward outstanding achievements in the field of science and art. (In Fortsetzung alter bayerischer Tradition wird der Bayerische Maximiliansorden für Wissenschaft und Kunst geschaffen. Mit ihm sollen herausragende Leistungen auf dem Gebieten von Wissenschaft und Kunst ausgezeichnet werden.)

Criteria 
The Maximilian Order is preferably awarded to German scientists and artists. It is not restricted to citizens of Bavaria. The order was instituted in one class and two sections (science and art). The order is restricted to 100 living members.

Nomination procedure 
The Minister-President, the minister of state for their respective portfolio, and the two sections of the order are eligible to nominate new members. These proposals are evaluated by an advisory committee (Ordensbeirat). It gives its recommendation to the Minister-President for the final decision.

The advisory committee consists of:
 the President of the Landtag of Bavaria,
 the member of the government who is deputy of the Minister-President,
 the State Minister of Sciences, Research and the Arts,
 the President of the Bavarian Academy of Sciences and Humanities,
 the President of the Bavarian Academy of Fine Arts,
 the President of one of the Bavarian Art Colleges (Kunsthochschulen),
 the President of one of the Bavarian Universities and
 a representative of the applied sciences, who is named by the Minister-President.
All members of the advisory committee are selected for a period of five years. The committee decides with the majority of its members.

Members 

From 1980 to 2018 the order has been awarded to 222 recipients. The number of living members of the order cannot exceed 100. As of December 2018 there are 95 living members of the order.

From 1853 to 1932 the order has been issued 351 times.

References

Citation

Sources 
 
 ; as book: 
  (The law)

External links 
 
 www.ordenmuseum.de: Der Bayerische Verdienstorden und Bayerischen Maximiliansorden für Wissenschaft und Kunst (German)

Arts awards in Germany
German science and technology awards
Orders, decorations, and medals of Bavaria
Orders, decorations, and medals of the states of Germany
History of Bavaria
Kingdom of Bavaria
Awards established in 1853
Awards disestablished in the 1930s
Awards established in 1980
1853 establishments in Bavaria
1933 disestablishments in Germany
1980 establishments in West Germany